The 2008 North Alabama Lions football team represented the University of North Alabama in the 2008 NCAA Division II football season.

Schedule

}}

Game summaries

Southern Arkansas

at No. 4 Carson-Newman

Henderson State

at West Georgia

Harding

Arkansas Tech

North Greenville

Delta State

Valdosta State

Arkansas-Monticello

West Alabama

References

North Alabama
North Alabama Lions football seasons
North Alabama Lions football